Füzesgyarmati Sport Klub is a professional football club based in Füzesgyarmat, Békés County, Hungary, that competes in the Nemzeti Bajnokság III, the third tier of Hungarian football.

History
Füzesgyarmati SK is going to compete in the 2019–20 Nemzeti Bajnokság III.

Naming history
Füzesgyarmati TE: ? - 1949
Füzesgyarmati EPOSz: 1949 - 1950
Füzesgyarmati DISz: 1950 - 1952
Füzesgyarmati KSK: 1952 - 1957
Füzesgyarmati MEDOSZ: 1957 - ?
Füzesgyarmati TSZ SK: ? - ?
Füzesgyarmati SK

Players

First-team squad

Club officials

Board of directors

Current technical staff

Season results
As of 4 March 2023

External links
 Profile on Magyar Futball

References

Football clubs in Hungary
Association football clubs established in 1950
1950 establishments in Hungary
Füzesgyarmat